Merry Clayton is the third studio album by soul singer Merry Clayton, released in 1971 on the Ode Records label.

Reception
AllMusic Guide's editorial board gave Merry Clayton four out of five stars and have noted it as an album pick in her catalogue. Billboard called the music "excellent" with "potential to be a monster" commercial success.

Track listing

Personnel
Merry Clayton – vocals
Wilton Felder – bass
Paul Humphrey – drums
David T. Walker – guitar
Billy Preston, Carole King, Clarence McDonald, Jerry Peters, Joe Sample – keyboards
Abigail Haness, Jerry Peters, Merry Clayton, Patrice Holloway, James Cleveland – backing vocals
Curtis Amy – saxophone
Lou Adler – production
Jim McCrary – photography
Hank Cicalo – engineering

Chart performance
Merry Clayton topped out at number 180 on the Billboard 200 and spent 11 weeks on the chart and reached 36 during nine weeks on the Soul charts (later renamed Top R&B/Hip-Hop Albums).

References

External links 
 

1971 albums
Merry Clayton albums
Albums produced by Lou Adler
Ode Records albums